Juan Manuel Fangio II (born September 19, 1956 in Balcarce, Buenos Aires, Argentina) is an Argentine former auto racing driver. He is the nephew of five-time Formula One champion Juan Manuel Fangio.

After some experience in European Formula Three, Fangio debuted as a professional auto racer in IMSA in 1984 in the Miami Grand Prix in a Porsche 935 with Hugo Gralia. He had an award-winning career, winning two GTP driver's championships, as well as 2 manufacturer titles when he was racing for Toyota and All American Racers. Fangio further established his legacy in the world of auto racing by winning the prestigious 12 Hours of Sebring two times (as did his uncle), posting 21 GTP wins, and establishing an IMSA record with 19 solo victories. His victories came while driving the Eagle HF89/90 and Eagle MkIII GTP cars.

Fangio won ten pole positions during his career. He made most of his driving career in the United States and was chosen in 1992 and 1993 as an "All-American" by the American Auto Racing Writers and Broadcasters Association (AARWBA), an organization which also named Fangio their 1992 driver of the year. He also participated in the CART series, but did not win any races, a fact that he regretted.

His boss, and also a personal friend, was Dan Gurney. In 1997, Fangio called Gurney to let him know that he was retiring from CART competition. He told Gurney, "I have discovered that regardless of what my passion says, despite what I command my mind to do, I am no longer able to give my whole being, my total focus at the exclusion of everything else to this sport that I love. 99% is not enough, I shall stop." Gurney described Fangio as "A gentleman in a driver's suit with a core of steel exuding an aura of Latin American dignity and honor even in the worst of circumstances will be missing from the grid".

Fangio returned home in 1998 to race in the South American Super Touring Car Championship. He finished fifth in the standings with one win and five podiums at the wheel of a Peugeot 406. Shortly after, he retired from motorsports after a final appearance at the 12 Hours of Sebring in 1999 with a Ferrari 333 SP, finishing in sixth place for Doyle-Risi Racing.

Fangio currently resides in his hometown of Balcarce, Argentina.

Career results

Complete International Formula 3000 results
(key) (Races in bold indicate pole position; races in italics indicate fastest lap.)

Complete 24 Hours of Le Mans results

Complete IMSA GTP results
(key)

American Open-Wheel racing results
(key)

Indy Lights

CART

Complete American Le Mans Series results

International Race of Champions
(key) (Bold – Pole position. * – Most laps led.)

External links

On his retirement
Biography on AAR's site

1956 births
Argentine racing drivers
Champ Car drivers
Indy Lights drivers
Atlantic Championship drivers
24 Hours of Le Mans drivers
American Le Mans Series drivers
Living people
Sportspeople from Buenos Aires Province
International Race of Champions drivers
Argentine people of Italian descent
International Formula 3000 drivers
Barber Pro Series drivers
12 Hours of Sebring drivers
PacWest Racing drivers
TOM'S drivers